Kukliš is a village in the municipality of Strumica, North Macedonia. It used to be a municipality of its own and its FIPS code was MK55.

Demographics
According to the 2002 census, the village had a total of 2,532 inhabitants. Ethnic groups in the village include:

Macedonians 2,529
Serbs 2
Others 1

References

Villages in Strumica Municipality